Amblyglyphidodon leucogaster also known as the yellowbelly damselfish  is a species of marine fish in the family Pomacentridae, the damselfishes and clownfishes. It's widespread throughout the tropical waters of the Indo-West Pacific, Red Sea included. It's a small size fish that can reach a maximum size of 13 cm length.

References

External links
 

leucogaster
Fish described in 1847